Joseph Tucker (August 21, 1832 – November 28, 1907) was an American politician who served as the 28th Lieutenant Governor for the Commonwealth of Massachusetts from 1869 to 1873.

Early life and career
Joseph Tucker was born in Lenox, Massachusetts on August 21, 1832, to George J. and Eunice Cook Tucker. Both his father and grandfather were treasurers of Berkshire County. Joseph's youngest brother George was also county treasurer.

Tucker graduated from Lenox Academy and attended Williams College, graduating in 1851. He then studied at Harvard Law School and was admitted to the Berkshire bar in 1854. After graduating, Tucker practiced law in St. Louis until 1860. Following the outbreak of the Civil War, Tucker worked in Great Barrington, Massachusetts.

Military career
In September 1862, Tucker enlisted in the 49th Regiment Massachusetts Volunteer Infantry. During the Red River Campaign, Tucker served as acting assistant adjutant general.

At the Battle of Plains Store, Tucker was shot in the right knee, requiring an amputation of the right leg. After the amputation, Tucker was sent home.

Political career
Tucker's political career started in November 1863 when Governor John Albion Andrew appointed him superintendent of recruiting in Berkshire County.

In 1865, Tucker won his first elected position to the Massachusetts House of Representatives. He represented the 7th Berkshire district, which encompassed his hometown of Great Barrington, as well as Alford and Monterey. While a representative, Tucker served on the Joint Committee on Military Affairs.

Tucker was elected to the Massachusetts Senate in 1866. He originally represented the South Berkshire District, encompassing Alford, Becket, Egremont, Great Barrington, Lee, Lenox, Monterey, Mount Washington, New Marlborough, Otis, Richmond, Sandisfield, Sheffield, Stockbridge, Tyringham, Washington, and West Stockbridge. In this position, Tucker served on the Senate Committee on the Judiciary and chaired the Joint Committee on Military Affairs. He also chaired the Joint Special Committee on Soldiers and Sailors, and Families of the Slain, and served on the Joint Special Committee on the Petition of Pierce, Bacon and Others, for a License Law.

In 1867, Senator Tucker was redistricted to the Berkshire and Hampshire District, encompassing Alford, Becket, Egremont, Great Barrington, Lee, Lenox, Monterey, Mount Washington, New Marlborough, Otis, Sandisfield, Sheffield, Stockbridge, Tyringham, West Stockbridge, Chesterfield, Cummington, Goshen, Huntington, Middlefield, Plainfield, and Worthington. Tucker continued to serve on the Senate Committee on the Judiciary and chair the Joint Committee on Military Affairs and Joint Special Committee on Expenditures for State Aid to Soldiers, etc. Tucker also became the chairman of the Joint Special Committee on Purchase of Western Railroad.

He died at his home in Pittsfield on November 28, 1907.

See also
 88th Massachusetts General Court (1867)

References

1832 births
1907 deaths
Harvard Law School alumni
Lieutenant Governors of Massachusetts
Massachusetts lawyers
Republican Party Massachusetts state senators
Republican Party members of the Massachusetts House of Representatives
People of Massachusetts in the American Civil War
Union Army soldiers
Williams College alumni